The Senior Bowl is a post-season college football all-star game played annually in late January or early February in Mobile, Alabama, which showcases the best NFL Draft prospects of those players who have completed their college eligibility. Produced by the non-profit Mobile Arts & Sports Association, the game is also a charitable fund-raiser, benefiting various local and regional organizations with over US$7.8 million in donations over its history. The game is sponsored by Reese's, a brand of The Hershey Company, and is televised by the NFL Network.

History

The 1950 Senior Bowl, the inaugural edition, was played at Gator Bowl Stadium in Jacksonville, Florida; the game then moved to Mobile's Ladd–Peebles Stadium the next year, where it remained through the 2020 edition. Starting with the 2021 edition, the game is played at Hancock Whitney Stadium on the campus of the University of South Alabama, also in Mobile.

Historically, the Senior Bowl was the first chance its participants had to openly receive pay for participation in an athletic event. Players in the inaugural 1950 game each received $343 (if on the losing team) or $475 (if on the winning team); by 1975, the amounts had been increased to $1,250 and $1,500. The 1988 edition was the last time players were paid ($1,500 and $1,750). This was one reason that participation was limited to seniors whose eligibility for further participation in college football had expired. Athletes who wished to play spring collegiate sports, such as college baseball, or otherwise remain eligible for amateur sports, had to avoid participation in the Senior Bowl.

The game has consistently been played on a Saturday in January, with the exception of 1976, when it was held on a Sunday. The scheduling date within January has varied – the earliest playing has been January 3 (1953 and 1959), while the latest playing prior to the 2022 edition has been January 30 (2010 and 2016). Since 1967, it has been traditionally set for the week before the NFL's Super Bowl (which itself is now played in February). It is usually scheduled as the final game of the college football season, although for a period during the 1980s and 1990s, it was the next-to-the-last game, followed a week later by either the Hula Bowl or the Gridiron Classic. From 2007 through 2011, and also in 2013, the Senior Bowl was again the penultimate game, followed by the Texas vs The Nation game a week later. In 2020, the revived Hula Bowl was played the day after the Senior Bowl.

CBS acquired national television coverage rights to the 1952 through 1954 games, though they never televised the games nationally under those rights. The first nationally televised Senior Bowl was in 1958 by NBC, and the games have been televised every year since. To commemorate the occasion and the publicity that the televising of the Senior Bowl would draw to the state of Alabama, Gov. James E. Folsom commissioned each player in the 1958 game as Honorary Admirals in the Alabama State Navy, as well as Senior Bowl founder Jimmy Pearre, North squad coach Joe Kuharich, South squad coach Paul Brown, and South squad past-coach Steve Owens; announcers for the televised event, Red Grange and Lindsey Nelson, were commissioned Honorary Colonels in the Alabama State Militia. ESPN televised the game as early as 1982, continuing until the game moved to the NFL Network starting with the 2007 edition.

Sponsors of the game have included Delchamps, a supermarket chain headquartered in Mobile; Food World, a supermarket chain headquartered in Birmingham; Under Armour; and Nike, Inc. Starting with the 2014 game, Reese's took over sponsorship. In January 2018, Reese's announced that they were extending their sponsorship of the game through at least the 2020 edition.

In March 2020, the Senior Bowl registered "The draft starts in Mobile" as a service mark. In October 2020, Panini America entered a multi-year agreement to produce trading cards for Senior Bowl players.

Game format
For most editions of the Senior Bowl, players have been rostered into North and South teams. In 1991, team names were changed to AFC and NFC, to distinguish where their coaching staffs were from and to stress the professional nature of the game. This was somewhat confusing, as the Senior Bowl is played early in the calendar year, typically several months before players are selected by teams in the NFL draft. Additionally, both coaching staffs for the 1993 game came from AFC teams. In 1994, team designations were reverted to the North vs. South format. In 2021, the bowl moved to American and National team designations.

The two teams are coached by coaching staffs that are selected from two NFL teams. In recent years, the coaching staffs have come from teams who finished near the bottom of the league standings, but whose coaches were not subsequently terminated. Beginning with the 2022 edition, head coaches serve in more of an advisory capacity while promoting select assistants into leadership roles on the staff.

Organizers stipulate a number of specific rules for the game, some of which are intended to reduce the chance of injury (e.g. "All blocks below the waist are prohibited"), and others that simplify what the teams need to practice and prepare for (e.g. "Only four rushers allowed, no 5-man pressures or blitzes from secondary permitted"). The game is also the players' first time competing under the slightly different professional rules (e.g. receivers must have both feet inbounds for a legal catch vs. just one foot inbounds in college football).

The week-long practice that precedes the game is attended by key NFL personnel (including coaches, general managers and scouts), who oversee the players as possible prospects for professional football. Athletes sometimes decline invitations to participate in the Senior Bowl, opting instead to prepare for the NFL scouting combine or their college's pro day.

The single-season record for number of players sent to the Senior Bowl from one school is 10 by Alabama in 1987, followed by nine sent by Auburn in 1988 and USC in 2008.

Dan Lynch of Washington State was the first (and to date only) player to appear in two Senior Bowls (1984 and 1985), having been granted an extra year of eligibility after the 1984 game. In 2013, two players (D. J. Fluker and Justin Pugh) with a year of college football eligibility remaining, but who had already graduated, became the first "fourth-year juniors" to be granted clearance to play in the Senior Bowl.

Game results

All-time series, through the 2023 game (74 editions): South (35–30–3); AFC (2–1); National (3–0)
The first game was played in Jacksonville, Florida, in 1950. All subsequent games have been played in Mobile, Alabama.

Game records

Coaching appearances

Seven people have served as head coach in four or more Senior Bowls.

Games coached by NFL teams

Each of the current 32 NFL teams has coached in at least one Senior Bowl. Records include games played under a franchise's prior names (e.g. Boston Patriots appearances are included in the record of the New England Patriots). Updated through the 2023 game (74 editions, 148 appearances).

MVPs

Source:

 denotes an MVP whose college team was not part of the top tier of college football (e.g. FBS, Division I-A, or historical predecessors) at the time they played in the Senior Bowl. There have been four such MVPs: Terry Bradshaw (Louisiana Tech, 1969 College Division season), Bill Kollar (Montana State, 1973 Division II season), Neil Lomax (Portland State, 1980 Division I–AA season), and Kyle Lauletta (Richmond, 2017 FCS season).

50th Anniversary Senior Bowl All-Time Team
The following team was selected by fan voting before the 1999 game:

Offense

 Defense

HOF: C=College, P=Pro

Heisman Trophy winners

The following players who won the Heisman Trophy also played in the Senior Bowl. To date, the only Heisman Trophy winner to be named Senior Bowl MVP was Pat Sullivan in 1972.

2020 winner DeVonta Smith accepted an invitation to the 2021 edition, but did not play.

Senior Bowl Hall of Fame

Established in 1987, the Senior Bowl Hall of Fame seeks to pay tribute to the many outstanding former Senior Bowl players who have made lasting contributions to the game of football. The Senior Bowl Hall of Fame also allows enshrinement to former coaches, administrators and other individuals whose efforts helped the Senior Bowl.

 1988 – Joe Greene, Lee Roy Jordan, Steve Largent, Joe Namath, Walter Payton, Pat Sullivan, Jim Taylor, Travis Tidwell
 1989 – Ed Jones, Ozzie Newsome, John Stallworth, Gene Upshaw, Jack Youngblood
 1990 – Paul Brown, Tucker Frederickson, Jerry Kramer, Neil Lomax, Wellington Mara, Finley McRae, Jack Pardee, Rea Scheussler
 1991 – Morten Andersen, James Brooks, Dave Butz, Weeb Ewbank, Doug Williams
 1992 – Franco Harris, Mike Holovak, Sam Huff, Dan Marino, Don Shula, Pat Swilling
 1993 – Cornelius Bennett, Bear Bryant, Ralph Jordan, Tom Landry, Marty Schottenheimer, Lynn Swann
 1994 – Robert Brazile, Rickey Jackson, Mark Rypien, Jim Simpson
 1995 – Bob Baumhower, Pat Dye, Bo Jackson, Gene Washington
 1996 – James Lofton, Dick Steinberg, Kellen Winslow
 1997 – Bob Hayes, Sterling Sharpe, Doak Walker
 1998 – Jim McMahon, Ray Nitschke, Thurman Thomas
 1999 – Tom Banks, Dale Carter, Paul Krause, Albert Lewis, Randall McDaniel, Art Monk, E. B. Peebles, Jr., Derrick Thomas, Roger Wehrli
 2000 – Hanford Dixon, Brett Favre, Chuck Howley
 2001 – William Andrews, Ron Jaworski, Eddie Robinson
 2002 – Todd Christensen, Bert Jones, Steve McNair
 2003 – Terry Beasley, Jeremiah Castille, Ted Hendricks
 2004 – Derrick Brooks, Christian Okoye, Richard Todd
 2005 – Larry Allen, Al Del Greco, Ray Perkins
 2006 – Curtis Martin, Tony Nathan, Michael Strahan
 2007 – E. J. Junior, Jake Plummer, Hines Ward
 2008 – Dean Kleinschmidt, Kevin Mawae, Brian Urlacher
 2009 – Jason Taylor, Shaun Alexander
 2010 – Larry Johnson, Terrell Owens
 2011 – None, due to NFL lockout
 2012 – Keith Brooking, Donovan McNabb, Dan Reeves
 2013 – John Abraham, Sylvester Croom, Aeneas Williams
 2014 – Bill Kollar, Torry Holt, DeMarcus Ware
 2015 – Woodrow Lowe, Tony Richardson, Kyle Williams
 2016 – Steve Hutchinson, Bill Curry, Tamba Hali
 2017 – Blaine Bishop, Lance Briggs, Jim Harbaugh
 2018 – Al Wilson, Phil Villapiano, Jay Novacek
 2019  – Rodney Hudson, DeMarco McNeil, Billy Neighbors
 2020 – None, due to COVID-19 pandemic
 2021 – Cameron Jordan, Joe Staley, Patrick Surtain, Fred Taylor, Reggie Wayne
 2022 – Kevin Faulk, Von Miller, Dak Prescott, Philip Rivers, Patrick Willis

Source:

See also
Cactus Bowl (Division II)
List of college bowl games

Notes

References

Further reading

External links
 
 
 Senior Bowl at NFL.com

 
College football all-star games
Sports in Mobile, Alabama
Recurring sporting events established in 1950
Events in Mobile, Alabama